Ronny is a 1931 musical comedy film directed by Roger Le Bon and Reinhold Schünzel and starring Käthe von Nagy, Marc Dantzer and Fernand Frey. It was made by UFA as the French-language version of Ronny. Such multiple-language versions were common in the early years of sound.

Cast
 Käthe von Nagy as Ronny  
 Marc Dantzer as Rudolph, Prince of Perusa  
 Fernand Frey as the Minister  
 Lucien Baroux as Theater director  
 Georges Deneubourg as Minister of Justice  
 Gustave Huberdeau as Minister of State  
 Charles Fallot as Finance Minister 
 Monique Casty as Lisa  
 Guy Sloux as Bomboni  
 Lucien Callamand as Anton

References

Bibliography 
 Bock, Hans-Michael & Bergfelder, Tim. The Concise CineGraph. Encyclopedia of German Cinema. Berghahn Books, 2009.

External links 
 

1931 films
German musical comedy films
1931 musical comedy films
1930s French-language films
Films directed by Roger Le Bon
Films directed by Reinhold Schünzel
UFA GmbH films
German multilingual films
German black-and-white films
1931 multilingual films
1930s German films